Kaushal Kishore may refer to 

Kaushal Kishore (politician) (born 1960), Lok Sabha member from Mohanlalganj constituency, Uttar Pradesh
Kaushal Kishore (scientist) (1942–1999), Indian polymer chemist